Prajapati is a Vedic deity of Hinduism.

Prajapati may also refer to:

Deities
 Brahma, god of creation 
 Agni, god of fire
 Indra, king of the devas 
 Vishvakarma, divine architect of the devas 
 Daksha, god of ritual

Arts and entertainment
 Prajapati (novel), a 1967 Bengali novel by Samaresh Basu
 Prajapati (film), a 1993 Bengali film directed by Biplab Chatterjee based on the novel 
 Prajapathi, a 2006 Malayalam-language action drama film directed by Ranjith

People
 Kumhar, a caste or community in India, Nepal and Pakistan, sometimes referred to as "Prajapati" 
 Vataliya Prajapati, a Hindu subcaste of the Kumhar

Given name
 Prajapati Mishra (1898–1952), Indian politician
 Prajapati Trivedi (born 1953), Indian economist 
 Prajapati Gautami, foster-mother, step-mother and maternal aunt of the Buddha

Surname
 Tulsiram Prajapati (died 2005), Indian man  killed in custody
 Aryan Prajapati (born 2008), Indian child actor
 Maharaji Prajapati,  Indian politician 
 Gayatri Prasad Prajapati, Indian politician, convicted of rape and imprisoned 
 Sunil Prajapati, Nepalese politician
 Kashyap Prajapati (born 1995), Indian-born cricketer 
 Archana Prajapati (born 1996 or 1997), Indian actress and model 
 Arjun Prajapati (1957–2020), Indian artist
 Dayanand Prajapati (born 1969), Indian director and religious singer 
 Brajesh Kumar Prajapati, Indian politician 
 N. P. Prajapati (1958), Indian politician 
 Shivcharan Prajapati, Indian politician
 M. R. Prajapati, Indian rural innovator  and inventor  
 Govind Prajapati, Indian politician 
 Dharmveer Prajapati (born 1963), Indian politician 
 Ranbir Singh Prajapati (born 1964), Indian politician
 Deepika Prajapati (born 1994), Indian archer 
 Shailesh Prajapati actor of Ernie, a supporting character in Power Rangers Megaforce
 Bala Prajapathi Adikalar, religious figure in Ayyavazhi

Other
 Prajapati Halt railway station, a railway station in Bihar 
 Daksh Prajapati temple, a Hindu temple dedicated to Lord Shiva

See also
 Projapoti (disambiguation)
 Painted bat, also known as "butterfly bat" (Projapoti Badur)